Doreen Ingleton (born 11 January 1956) is an English actress, known for Everybody Loves Sunshine, The Incredible Adventures of Professor Branestawm and Filth: The Mary Whitehouse Story.

Credits

Television

Film

References

External links
 

Living people
1956 births
Black British actresses
English television actresses